The  HTC Titan (stylized and marketed as uppercase HTC TITAN; also known as the HTC Eternity in China, and HTC Ultimate in Brazil), is a smartphone running the Windows Phone OS 7.5 (codename Mango) operating system. The phone was designed and manufactured by HTC Corporation. It is the successor to the HTC HD7.

Description

HTC announced the HTC Titan on September 1, 2011, in London. It has a 4.7-inch S-LCD screen which was the largest available on any Windows Phone at the time of its release. The HTC Titan also has a 1.5 GHz processor with 512 MB RAM and 16 GB internal memory.

On 9 January 2012, the successor to the Titan, the Titan II, was announced as the first Windows Phone handset with LTE. The Titan II is similar to the Titan, with the major changes being LTE enabled and improving the camera to 16 megapixels.

Reception
The phone has been well received by reviewers. It has been called the flagship Windows phone by multiple reviewers.

See also
Windows Phone

References

External links
Official HTC Titan homepage

Windows Phone devices
HTC smartphones
Mobile phones introduced in 2011
Discontinued smartphones